Writers have been adding to Burmese literature for over a millennium. In the period since self-government in 1948, Burmese writers have frequently had to face censorship imposed under socialist and military governments.

A

 Aung Thin
 Aye Aye Win

B

 Ba Shin
Ba Than (historian)
Bamaw tin aung Lin Yone
Chan Nyein(Han Thar Waddy)

D

 Dagon Khin Khin Lay
 Dagon Taya

E
Empire Mergui

F
Fundation of Mergui

G

H

 Hla Pe
 Hmawbi Saya Thein
 Hsu Shin
 Htin Gyi

I

J

 Journal Kyaw Ma Ma Lay
 Journal Kyaw U Chit Maung
 James Hla Kyaw
 Ju

K

 Professor Dr. Daw Kay Thi Tun or Kay Thi Tun
 Khin Sein Hlaing
 khin maung Nyo
 Khin Khin Htoo
 Khin Maung Nyunt
 Khin Myo Chit
 Khin Hnin Yu
 Kyi Aye
 Ko Tar

L

 Edward Michael Law-Yone
 Ludu Daw Amar
 Ludu Sein Win
 Ludu U Hla
 Linkar Ye Kyaw

M
 Mahar Swe
 Ma Sandar
 Ma Thanegi
 Ma Thida
 Maung Htin Aung
 Maung Khin Min (Danubyu)
 Maung Maung
 Maung Thaw Ka
 Maung Wunna
 Maung Wuntha
 Mi Mi Khaing
 Min Lu
 Min Theinkha
 Min Thu Wun
 Moe Hein
 Mya Than Tint
 Myint Myint Khin
 Myoma Myint Kywe
 Maung Sein Win
 Ma Win Myint

N

 Nan Nyunt Swe
 Nanda Thein Zan
 Nat Nwe
 Nay Win Myint
 Nu Nu Yi
 Nwe Soe
 Nyo Mya
 Nyi Pu Lay

O

 Ohn Pe

P

 P Moe Nin
 Pascal Khoo Thwe
 Pe Aung
 Paragu
 Pe Maung Tin
 Pho Hlaing
 Po Kya

Q

R

 Richard Bartholomew

S

 San San Nweh
 Sao Saimong
 Saw Mon Nyin

T

 Taw Phayar Galay
 Tekkatho Phone Naing
 Thakin Kodaw Hmaing
 Thakin Lwin
 Thakin Tin Mya
 Than Tun
 Thant Myint-U
 Thein Pe Myint
 Theippan Maung Wa
 Thu Kha
 Thu Maung
 Tin Moe
 Tin Shwe

U

 U Nu
 U Ottama
 U Thaung
 U Zawtika

V

W

X

Y

Z

 Zawgyi
 Zaw Zaw Aung

 
Writers
Burmese